William Clancy Little (1840 – 18 June 1902) was a politician in Queensland, Australia. He was a Member of the Queensland Legislative Assembly.

References

Members of the Queensland Legislative Assembly
1840 births
1902 deaths
19th-century Australian politicians